The Roman Catholic Diocese of Lai is a diocese in Lai in the ecclesiastical province of N'Djamena in Chad.

History
 November 28, 1998: Established as Diocese of Lai from the Diocese of Doba and Diocese of Moundou

Special churches
The pro-cathedral is the Cathédrale de la Sainte-Famille in Lai.

Leadership
 Bishops of Lai (Roman rite)
 Bishop Miguel Angel Sebastián Martínez, M.C.C.I. (November 28, 1998 - October 10, 2018), appointed Bishop of Sarh
 Bishop Nicolas Nadji Bab (appointed Administrator in November 2018) (December 14, 2019 -)

See also
Roman Catholicism in Chad

References

Sources
 GCatholic.org
 Catholic Hierarchy

Lai
Christian organizations established in 1998
Roman Catholic dioceses and prelatures established in the 20th century
Roman Catholic Ecclesiastical Province of N'Djaména